Francis, Baron Delpérée is a Belgian politician and a member of the cdH born on 14 January 1942 in Liege. He was elected as a member of the Belgian Senate in 2007. During his studies at the Université catholique de Louvain he was a member of the Olivaint Conference of Belgium.

Notes

Living people
Academic staff of the Université catholique de Louvain
Centre démocrate humaniste politicians
Members of the Belgian Federal Parliament
1942 births
21st-century Belgian politicians
Recipients of the Order pro Merito Melitensi